WTRE may refer to:

 WTRE (AM), a radio station (1330 AM) licensed to serve Greensburg, Indiana, United States
 WEGT (FM), a radio station (89.9 FM) licensed to serve Greensburg, Indiana, which held the call sign WTRE-FM from 2012 to 2019